This is a list of populated places in the Indonesian province of Central Java. The administrative capital of Central Java is Semarang. It is bordered by West Java in the west, the Indian Ocean and the Special Region of Yogyakarta in the south, East Java in the east, and the Java Sea in the north. It has a total area of 32,548 km², with a population of 34,552,500 million in mid 2019, making it the third-most populous province in both the island of Java and the country of Indonesia, after West Java and East Java. The province also includes the island of Nusakambangan in the south (close to the border of West Java), and the Karimun Jawa Islands in the Java Sea.

This list is organized by regency, with the seat of each regency bolded. Where a populated place is within an independent municipality, it is placed beneath it.

Independent municipalities 
 Pekalongan
 Salatiga
 Semarang
 Sampangan
 Surakarta
 Pasar Kliwon
 Tegal

Banjarnegara Regency 
Populated places in Banjarnegara Regency:

 Banjarnegara
 Banjengan
 Blimbing
 Bokol
 Candiwulan
 Glempang
 Jalatunda
 Kaliwungu
 Kebakalan
 Kebanaran
 Kertayasa
 Mandiraja
 Mandirajakulon
 Mandirajawetan
 Panggisari
 Purwasaba
 Salamerta
 Sijeruk
 Simbang
 Somawangi

Banyumas Regency 
Populated places in Banyumas Regency:
Purwokerto

Batang Regency 
Populated places in Batang Regency:
Batang
Yosorejo

Blora Regency 
Populated places in Blora Regency:
 Ledok

Boyolali Regency 
Populated places in Boyolali Regency:
 Selo

Brebes Regency 
Populated places in Brebes Regency:
 Benda
 Jatibarang Lor
 Pasir Panjang

Cilacap Regency 
Populated places in Cilacap Regency:
 Datar

Demak Regency 
Populated places in Demak Regency:
Demak

Grobogan Regency 
Populated places in Grobogan Regency:
Purwodadi

Jepara Regency 
Populated places in Jepara Regency:
Jepara
Persian

Karanganyar Regency 
Populated places in Karanganyar Regency:
Karanganyar

Kebumen Regency 
Populated places in Kebumen Regency:
Gombong
Kebumen

Klaten Regency 
Populated places in Klaten Regency:
 Bungasan
 Pokak
 Tonggalan

Kudus Regency 
Populated places in Kudus Regency:
Kudus, Indonesia

Magelang Regency 
Populated places in Magelang Regency:
Derpowangsan
Magelang
Mungkid
Muntilan

Pati Regency 
Populated places in Pati Regency:
Pati

Pekalongan Regency 
Populated places in Pekalongan Regency:
 Wonopringgo

Pemalang Regency 
Populated places in Pemalang Regency:
 Cangak

Purbalingga Regency 
Populated places in Purbalingga Regency:
 Bakulan

Purworejo Regency 
Populated places in Purworejo Regency:
Kiyangkongrejo
Purworejo

Semarang Regency 
Populated places in Semarang Regency:
Ambarawa
Tuntang
Ungaran

Tegal Regency 
Populated places in Tegal Regency:
Dukuhjati Wetan
Slawi

Wonosobo Regency 
Populated places in Wonosobo Regency:
Wadaslintang
Wonosobo

Populated places in Central Java

Indonesia, Central Java